Symphlebia alinda is a moth in the family Erebidae. It was described by Harrison Gray Dyar Jr. in 1909. It is found in Mexico.

References

Arctiidae genus list at Butterflies and Moths of the World of the Natural History Museum

Moths described in 1909
alinda